The Roslyn Tournament was a golf tournament held in New Zealand in 1963. The event was played on the Balmacewen course at Otago Golf Club in Dunedin, New Zealand. The tournament was reduced to 54 holes by heavy rain on the final day. Barry Coxon won the event by 1 stroke from Bob Tuohy.

Winners

References

Golf tournaments in New Zealand